Iliyan Strahilov Garov (born 8 January 1984 in Plovdiv) is a Bulgarian football played who plays defender for Levski Karlovo.

Career 
Garov started his career in city rival on Botev - Lokomotiv.  As an 18-year-old he signed his first professional contract for three years with Lokomotiv. After that is loaned for along one year in Vidima-Rakovski Sevlievo and Spartak Plovdiv. In June 2006 he signed with Botev Plovdiv on a free transfer. He became captain of the team in 2008, succeeding Daniel Bozhkov. After the conclusion of the 2008/2009 season he was released from the club and joined Lokomotiv Sofia.

On 21 June 2017 he joined Third League club Arda Kardzhali.  He left the club at the end of the season.  In July 2018, Garov signed with Gigant Saedinenie.

References

External links

Bulgarian footballers
1984 births
Living people
Footballers from Plovdiv
Association football defenders
PFC Lokomotiv Plovdiv players
PFC Vidima-Rakovski Sevlievo players
FC Spartak Plovdiv players
Botev Plovdiv players
FC Lokomotiv 1929 Sofia players
Knattspyrnufélagið Víkingur players
PFC Marek Dupnitsa players
FC Septemvri Sofia players
PFC Spartak Pleven players
FC Oborishte players
FC Arda Kardzhali players
FC Levski Karlovo players
First Professional Football League (Bulgaria) players
Second Professional Football League (Bulgaria) players
Úrvalsdeild karla (football) players
Bulgarian expatriate footballers
Expatriate footballers in Iceland